is a train station in Higashi-ku, Nagoya, Aichi Prefecture, Japan

The station provides access to the headquarters and broadcasting center of Chubu-Nippon Broadcasting (CBC.)

Lines

 (Station number: H11)

Layout

Platforms

References

External links
 

Railway stations in Japan opened in 1960
Railway stations in Aichi Prefecture